Eilidh Gibson (born 4 October 1995 in Kinross) is a Scottish slalom canoeist who has competed at the international level since 2012.

Gibson's best individual results include a silver in race 1 of the 2014 Canoe Slalom World Cup at Lee Valley White Water Centre, 4th place at the 2017 ICF Canoe Slalom World Championships and 4th place at the 2016 European Canoe Slalom Championships.

She won a gold medal in the C1 team event at the 2017 ICF Canoe Slalom World Championships in Pau.  She also won two golds and a bronze in the same event at the European Championships.

Gibson attended Strathallan School and studied biomedical sciences at the University of Edinburgh.

World Cup individual podiums

References

External links

1995 births
Living people
People educated at Strathallan School
Alumni of the University of Edinburgh
Sportspeople from Perth and Kinross
Scottish female canoeists
Medalists at the ICF Canoe Slalom World Championships